Juan Muguerza Sasieta (6 May 1900 – 5 May 1937) was a Spanish middle-distance runner. He competed in the men's 1500 metres at the 1920 Summer Olympics.

References

External links
 

1900 births
1937 deaths
Athletes (track and field) at the 1920 Summer Olympics
Spanish male middle-distance runners
Spanish male long-distance runners
Olympic athletes of Spain
Place of birth missing
People from Elgoibar
Sportspeople from Gipuzkoa
Military personnel killed in the Spanish Civil War
Spanish casualties of the Spanish Civil War
Athletes from the Basque Country (autonomous community)
Deaths by airstrike
Olympians killed in warfare